The Bollinger B1 is a four-wheel drive off-road SUV announced by Bollinger Motors along with a pickup truck variant, marketed as the Bollinger B2.

History
After Bollinger Motors was founded in 2014, a prototype announcing the company's first production electric off-road vehicle was unveiled in September 2017. The B1 Concept took the form of a three-door vehicle with an angular silhouette and matte paint.

The B1 was presented in September 2019, adopting cosmetic changes to the appearance of the lights, the radiator grille and, above all, the dimensions of the body compared to the study from two years ago. The vehicle became longer, gaining not a 3-door, but a 5-door body with an additional second row of seats.

Another characteristic element of the B1's appearance is the raw, angular body maintained in a minimalist design, which has also been preserved in the passenger compartment. The compartment for transporting long items extending from the edge of the front to the rear of the car was made possible by placing the electrical system longitudinally under the passenger compartment and by installing widely spaced seats.

B2

Simultaneously with the premiere of the serial B1, Bollinger also presented a pickup based on it, called Bollinger B2. It was distinguished by an extended wheelbase with a large transport compartment adjacent to the four-door, four-seat passenger cabin.

Sale
Production of serial Bollinger models was projected to begin at the end of 2020, while sales of B1 and B2 were originally expected to start in early 2021 with prices starting at $125,000. In January 2022, Bollinger announced that production of the B1 and B2 had been delayed indefinitely.

Technical data

See also
 Tesla Cybertruck

References

Electric concept cars
Mid-size sport utility vehicles
Upcoming car models
Bollinger vehicles